Caleb Seth Kleinpeter is an American politician serving as a member of the Louisiana State Senate for the 17th district. He assumed office on December 6, 2022.

Early life and education 
Kleinpeter was born in Baton Rouge, Louisiana, and raised in Grosse Tête and Brusly. He graduated from Brusly High School in 2000.

Career 
In 2001, Kleinpeter enlisted in the United States Marine Corps as a rifleman. Before his discharge in 2005, Kleinpeter was deployed to Iraq and Afghanistan. Since 2011, he has worked as a pipeline technician at Enterprise Products. Kleinpeter was elected to the Louisiana State Senate in November 2022.

References 

Living people
People from Baton Rouge, Louisiana
People from Iberville Parish, Louisiana
People from West Baton Rouge Parish, Louisiana
Louisiana Republicans
Louisiana state senators
Year of birth missing (living people)